Anthony Gell School is a coeducational secondary school and sixth form located in Wirksworth in the English county of Derbyshire.

It began as a Free Grammar School established by Anthony Gell in 1576. The school moved to its present site in 1908 and became a voluntary controlled school in 1944. It became a coeducational comprehensive school in 1965. As a voluntary controlled school, it is supported by the Anthony Gell School Foundation charitable trust, and administered by Derbyshire County Council.

Anthony Gell School offers GCSEs and BTECs as programmes of study for pupils, while students in the sixth form have the option to study from a range of A Levels, OCR Nationals and further BTECs.  the school's GCSE scores were increasing.

Notable former pupils
Lawrence Beesley, a survivor of the Titanic, who was widely reported in contemporary newspapers.
Dame Ellen MacArthur, a sailor who broke the world record for the fastest solo circumnavigation of the globe in 2005.
Oliver Smith, Youngest branch party president in British political history for The Liberal Democrats in 2006.
Laurence Bostock, the youngest British male to feature in the Skeleton World Cup in the end of January 2020 at St Moritz.

Houses 
Anthony Gell School is split into 5 houses. These houses are:

 Arkwright - Arkwright is named after Richard Arkwright who is a historical figure in the area known for his contributions to the Industrial Revolution and Cromford.
 Gell - Gell is named after Anthony Gell, the founder of the school.
 Fearne - Fearne is named after Agnes Fearne, a relative of Anthony Gell who made bequests to help fund the school.
 Wright - Wright is named after Joseph Wright of Derby, a British landscape and portrait painter. 
 Nightingale - Nightingale is named after Florence Nightingale, another historical figure in the area. Nightingale as a house was implemented to the school in 2019.

References

External links
Anthony Gell School official website

Secondary schools in Derbyshire
Educational institutions established in the 1570s
1576 establishments in England
Voluntary controlled schools in England
Wirksworth